Sir Charles Ernest St John Branch KC (2 June 1865 – 1939), known as St John Branch, was Chief Justice of Jamaica and the 23rd Chief Justice of Ceylon.

Charles Ernest Branch was born in San Ferdinand, Trinidad.

In 1910 he was made Auditor General of Jamaica and in 1921 a puisne judge in the Straits Settlements. In 1923 he returned to Jamaica as Chief Justice, a position he held until 1925. He was made a Knight Bachelor in the 1924 Birthday Honours.

On 3 July 1925 he was appointed Chief Justice of Ceylon, succeeding Anton Bertram, a position he held  until 25 May 1926, when he was succeeded by Stanley Fisher.

He died in Horsham, West Sussex in 1939. He had married Agnes Irene Templer on 24 March 1900 and had two sons, the younger of which was killed in World War II.

References

|-

1865 births
1939 deaths
Chief justices of Jamaica
Chief Justices of British Ceylon
20th-century Sri Lankan lawyers
19th-century Sri Lankan people
Sri Lankan people of British descent
Alumni of Codrington College
20th-century Jamaican judges